Alabama's 5th congressional district is a U.S. congressional district in Alabama, which elects a representative to the United States House of Representatives. It encompasses the counties of Lauderdale, Limestone, Madison, Morgan and most of Jackson. It is currently represented by Republican Dale Strong, a former Madison County Commissioner. Strong was elected in 2022 following the retirement of Republican incumbent Mo Brooks.

Character 

Two major economic projects have lastingly impacted the 5th district and have indelibly dictated the politics of North Alabama for most of the 20th Century. Before 1933, the Northern Alabama counties were characteristically poor, white and rural. The Tennessee Valley Authority's (TVA) arrival changed much of that, slowly transforming the demographic towards technical and engineering employees. The second major project was the space and rocketry programs including Redstone Arsenal in Huntsville where the first large U.S. Ballistic missiles were developed. Additionally, NASA built the Marshall Space Flight Center in the Huntsville-Decatur area during the 1960s. In the late 1950s Northern Alabama came to be dominated by the high-tech and engineering industries, a trend which has continued up to the present. In recent years, the United Launch Alliance has located its research center in Decatur. As a result, Huntsville has become the second largest and fastest growing metropolitan area in Alabama.

For a time, the district bucked the increasing Republican trend in Alabama.  It was the only district in the state that supported Walter Mondale in 1984, but hasn't supported a Democrat for president since then. Democrats continue to hold most offices at the local level, and continued to hold most of the district's seats in the Alabama state legislature until the Republicans swept nearly all of north Alabama's seats in 2010. In the mid-1990s, it was a seriously contested seat, with longtime Democratic incumbent Bud Cramer winning reelection by only 1,770 votes in 1994. However, Cramer was elected five more times with 70 percent or more of the vote and even ran unopposed in the Democratic landslide year of 2006. Cramer did not seek reelection in 2008. Parker Griffith, a retired oncologist and State Senator, won the open seat in November 2008. However, in December 2009, Griffith became a Republican. Until Griffith's switch, the district had been one of the last in the former Confederacy not to have sent a Republican to the U.S. Congress since Reconstruction. Griffith was ousted in the Republican primary by current Representative Mo Brooks.

George W. Bush won 60% of the vote in this district in 2004. John McCain also carried the 5th district in 2008 with 60.91% of the vote while Barack Obama received 37.99%.

Recent election results from statewide races

List of members representing the district

Recent election results
These are the results from the previous ten election cycles in Alabama's 5th district.

2002

2004

2006

2008

2010

2012

2014

2016

2018

2020

2022

Historical district boundaries

See also

Alabama's congressional districts
List of United States congressional districts

References
Specific

General
 
 
 Congressional Biographical Directory of the United States 1774–present
 

05
Colbert County, Alabama
Jackson County, Alabama
Lauderdale County, Alabama
Lawrence County, Alabama
Limestone County, Alabama
Madison County, Alabama
Morgan County, Alabama
Constituencies established in 1833
1833 establishments in Alabama
Constituencies disestablished in 1841
1841 disestablishments in Alabama
Constituencies established in 1843
1843 establishments in Alabama
Constituencies disestablished in 1861
1861 disestablishments in Alabama
Constituencies established in 1868
1868 establishments in Alabama
Constituencies disestablished in 1963
1963 disestablishments in Alabama
Constituencies established in 1965
1965 establishments in Alabama